The   was a Japanese domain of the Edo period.  It was associated with Bitchū Province in modern-day Okayama Prefecture.

History

The Niwase domain was founded in 1600, when Togawa Hideyasu's son Togawa Michiyasu, a retainer of Ukita Hideie, rebelled against his lord and sided with the Tokugawa clan at the Battle of Sekigahara. As a reward, the Tokugawa granted Togawa a 29,000 koku fief centered at Niwase Castle. Between the 2nd and fourth generations, parts of the territory were handed out to Michiyasu's various brothers, leaving Niwase with 20,000 koku by the tenure of the 4th generation lord, Yasukaze. Yasukaze died without an heir, and the Togawa family came to an end, with the domain confiscated by the shogunate. In 1683, the Kuze family was transferred to Niwase from Sekiyado, its landholdings were 50,000 koku. The Kuze were there for only one generation, under Kuze Shigeyuki, before being transferred to the Tanba-Kameyama Domain. Matsudaira Nobumichi became the next lord of Niwase, with a 30,000 koku territory; however, he too was transferred, after only 4 years, to the Kaminoyama Domain in Dewa Province.

In 1699, Itakura Shigetaka was transferred into Niwase, with a landholding of 20,000 koku. The domain remained under Itakura rule from then until the Meiji Restoration.  The domain school, the Sei'ikan (誠意館), was founded in 1818.

With the end of the han system in 1871, the domain was disbanded, and eventually incorporated into Okayama Prefecture, within which its territory remains to the present day.  The Itakura family became viscounts (shishaku 子爵) in the new kazoku nobility system.  One notable native of the Niwase Domain was the assassinated prime minister Inukai Tsuyoshi.

List of daimyōs 
The hereditary daimyōs were head of the clan and head of the domain.

Togawa clan, 1600–1679 (fudai; 30,000 koku)

 Togawa Satoyasu
Michiyasu
Masayasu
Yasunobu
Yasukaze

Kuze clan, 1683–1686 (fudai; 50,000 koku)

Shigeyuki

Matsudaira (Fujii) clan, 1693–1697 (fudai; 30,000 koku)

Nobumichi

Itakura clan, 1699–1871 (fudai; 20,000 koku)

Shigetaka
Masanobu
Katsuoki
Katsuyuki
Katsuyasu
Katsumoto
Katsusuke
Katsusada
Katsushige
Katsumasa
Katsuhiro

See also 
 List of Han
 Abolition of the han system

References

External links
 "Niwase" at Edo 300 

Domains of Japan
Fujii-Matsudaira clan
Itakura clan
Kuze clan